Márcio Souza may refer to:

 Márcio Souza (writer) (born 1946), Brazilian writer and journalist
 Márcio de Souza (born 1975), Brazilian hurdler
 Márcio Souza (footballer) (born 1980), Brazilian footballer